James P. Gourley Republican that served in the Pennsylvania House of Representatives for the 25th District of Philadelphia from 1909 to 1910.  He was born in Philadelphia and educated in St. Michael's Parochial School; studied law and was admitted to the bar.  Elected to the House of Representatives in November 1908.

References

Year of birth missing
Year of death missing
Republican Party members of the Pennsylvania House of Representatives
Politicians from Philadelphia
20th-century American politicians